Dinko "Dean" Lukin, OAM (born 26 May 1960) is a retired weightlifter from Australia. Lukin won the gold medal in the Super Heavyweight category at the 1984 Summer Olympics, held in Los Angeles. He carried the Australian flag during the closing ceremony of the 1984 games, and remains Australia's only Olympic gold medalist for weightlifting. He also saw success in the Commonwealth Games, winning gold medals in the super heavyweight division of the 1982 Brisbane games and the 1986 Edinburgh games.

Lukin was born in Sydney, but his family moved to the South Australian town of Port Lincoln when he was 5 years old. Lukin was a tuna fisherman who shot to fame as a weightlifter in the 1980s, then returned to run the family fishing business. In 2000, a portrait of him was hung in the Archibald Prize called Strongest Man of the Games, painted by David Bromley.

In a press conference following his 1984 Los Angeles Olympics gold medal, Lukin reportedly told assembled journalists that instead of focusing upon his victory, they should assemble for the disabled games and show those competitors as much time and respect as they had shown him. This was because their achievements were "far greater than mine."

In a bid to get healthier during the late 1980s, Lukin went on a diet and lost a lot of the weight that made him one of the top Super Heavyweight weightlifters in the world, claiming that his waist was now the size that his upper thighs were during the 1984 Olympic Games.

Lukin was inducted into the Sport Australia Hall of Fame in 1985.

References

External links
Lukin behind $40m Port Lincoln plan
An in depth look at Dean Lukin - South Australian Weightlifting Association
http://www.adelaidenow.com.au/fishing-wharf-in-100m-port-plan/story-e6frea6u-1226213180915

1960 births
Living people
Australian male weightlifters
Olympic weightlifters of Australia
Weightlifters at the 1984 Summer Olympics
Olympic gold medalists for Australia
Commonwealth Games gold medallists for Australia
Recipients of the Medal of the Order of Australia
Sport Australia Hall of Fame inductees
People from Port Lincoln
Australian people of Croatian descent
Olympic medalists in weightlifting
Medalists at the 1984 Summer Olympics
Commonwealth Games medallists in weightlifting
Weightlifters at the 1982 Commonwealth Games
Weightlifters at the 1986 Commonwealth Games
20th-century Australian people
21st-century Australian people
Medallists at the 1982 Commonwealth Games
Medallists at the 1986 Commonwealth Games